Acanthobrama urmianus is a species of freshwater cyprinid fish, which is endemic to  Iran.

References

urmianus
Fish described in 1899
Taxa named by Albert Günther